The 1991 South Kesteven District Council election for the South Kesteven District Council was held in South Kesteven in 1991.

Results

Deeping St James Ward

Market and West Deeping Ward

References

1991
1991 English local elections
1990s in Lincolnshire